UFC Fight Night: Henderson vs. Thatch (also known as UFC Fight Night 60) was a mixed martial arts event held on February 14, 2015, at the 1stBank Center in Broomfield, Colorado.

Background
The event was the third that the UFC has hosted at the venue.

A welterweight bout between Matt Brown and Tarec Saffiedine was expected to serve as the event headliner.  However, on January 1, the UFC announced that Saffiedine had pulled out of the bout, citing a groin injury he sustained in training. On January 13, Brown was pulled from the event in favor of a matchup with former UFC Welterweight champion Johny Hendricks at UFC 185. Subsequently, a welterweight bout between Stephen Thompson and Brandon Thatch was promoted to the main event.  In turn, Thompson pulled out of the fight on January 30, citing a rib injury. After UFC 183, it was announced that former WEC & UFC Lightweight champion Benson Henderson agreed to step up as a replacement.

Jake Lindsey was scheduled to face James Moontasri at the event. However, on January 26, Lindsey pulled out of the bout citing injury and was replaced by promotional newcomer Cody Pfister.

Thiago Tavares was expected to face Nik Lentz at the event. However, in late January, Tavares pulled out of the bout citing injury and was replaced five days later by promotional newcomer Levan Makashvili.  Subsequently, the pairing was scrapped just prior to the weigh-ins as Lentz was stricken with flu-like symptoms.

Both Patrick Walsh and James Moontasri missed weight on their first attempts at the weigh ins, coming in at 191.5 lb and 158 lb respectively. They were both given additional time to make the weight limits for their respective weight classes, but made no attempts to cut further. Instead, they were both fined 20 percent of their fight purses, which went to Dan Kelly and Cody Pfister respectively.

Results

Bonus awards
The following fighters were awarded $50,000 bonuses:
Fight of the Night: Benson Henderson vs. Brandon Thatch
Performance of the Night: Neil Magny and Ray Borg

See also
List of UFC events
2015 in UFC

References

UFC Fight Night
2015 in mixed martial arts
Mixed martial arts in Colorado
Sports in Broomfield, Colorado
February 2015 sports events in the United States
Events in Broomfield, Colorado